is a Japanese footballer who plays for Vegalta Sendai.

Career statistics
.

International career
On 7 May 2015, Japan's coach Vahid Halilhodžić called him for a two-days training camp.

Honours

Club
Kashima Antlers
J. League Division 1 (4) : 2007, 2008, 2009, 2016
Emperor's Cup (3) : 2007, 2010, 2016
 J. League Cup (3) : 2011, 2012, 2015
Japanese Super Cup (3) : 2009, 2010, 2017
Suruga Bank Championship (2) : 2012, 2013
 AFC Champions League (1): 2018

References

External links  

official instagram  
  

Profile at Kashima Antlers

1988 births
Living people
Association football people from Miyagi Prefecture
Japanese footballers
J1 League players
Kashima Antlers players
J2 League players
Vegalta Sendai players
Association football midfielders